Nancy Speck is a haematologist in the United States working at the University of Pennsylvania. She specialises in stem cell research.

In 2019, Speck was elected to the National Academy of Sciences.

References

American hematologists
Women hematologists
University of Pennsylvania faculty
21st-century American scientists
21st-century American women scientists
Members of the United States National Academy of Sciences
Living people
Year of birth missing (living people)
American women academics